Box Kite is a moderately difficult solitaire game using two decks. The object of the game is to move all of the cards to the foundations.

Rules
Box Kite has eight foundations located in the center.  The 8 foundation piles are divided into two groups.  There are four piles located on the top that start with a King, and build down in suit. e.g. K♥, Q♥, J♥, 10♥...

The other four piles start with an Ace and build up in suit, e.g. A♠, 2♠, 3♠, 4♠...

Surrounding the foundations are twelve tableau piles holding eight cards each.  These cards can build up or down regardless of suit, but only the top card of each pile can be moved, e.g. 10♥, J♣, 10♠, 9♦, 8♦...
 
Cards can be relocated between the top and bottom foundations.  There are no redeals in Box Kite.  The game is won after all cards have been moved to the foundations.

Variants

Box Kite is a variant of St. Helena (Napoleon's Favorite), which adds restrictions about playing to the foundations, but adds two redeals in order to compensate for the increased difficulty that this creates.

References

See also
 St. Helena
 List of solitaires
 Glossary of solitaire

Double-deck patience card games
Half-open packers